Kim Jong-seo (김종서, 金宗瑞; 1383 – 10 November 1453) was a prominent military official and politician of the early Joseon Dynasty. His ancestral home was Suncheon (順天). He was also known under the names Gukgyeong (國卿) and Jeoljae (節齋), and his posthumous name is Chungik (忠翼). In 1405, he passed the state examination and became a rank 13 official. He served King Sejong the Great as a general during the campaign against the Jurchens. In 1453, he was assassinated on the order of Prince Suyang along with his two sons. His tomb is located near Sejong City.

Biography

Early life

Kim Jong-Seo was born in 1383 in Yanggwang-do, Gongju as the son of Kim Su and Lady Bae of the Seongju Bae clan. He was the second of 3 brothers. All three siblings achieved successful political careers: his older brother Kim Jonghan was a high-ranking official, and his younger brother Kim Jongheung was the magistrate of Yangju.

Career

He passed the state examination in 1405 and in 1411 he was posted as a royal inspector to Gangwon Province. In 1433, he was sent by King Sejong the Great to conquer the Manchu. Kim's military campaign captured several castles, pushed north, and restored Korean territory roughly to the present-day border between North Korea and China.

The campaigns against the Jurchens

The tribe of Wild Jurchens (Yeren, 野人) often crossed the Tumen and Yalu rivers and made marauding incursions through the Joseon border.  Since the times of the Goryeo Dynasty, they have been conciliatory efforts through trade as well as attempted suppression of the raiders by force, but the border conflicts did not cease. Early in the Joseon Dynasty, the northern part of Yeongbyeon county was lost to the Jurchen invaders.

To solve the issue once for all, in 1433, King Sejong sent General Choi Yun-deok to suppress the Yeren in the Yalu River Basin. In October of the same year,  Kim Jong-seo led another expedition to the northern part of Hamgyeong province, where he defeated the Jurchens and strengthened the borders against future attacks.

Later life and death

Following King Sejong's death, Grand Prince Suyang's ill brother, Munjong took the throne but soon died. The crown passed to his 12-year-old son, Danjong. The new king was too young to rule the nation and all political processes were controlled by then-Chief State Councilor Hwangbo In and General Kim Jongseo. As Kim Jongseo and his faction, which included Danjong's guardian Princess Gyeonghye, used the chance to extend the power of court officials against many royal family members, the tension between Kim and Suyang greatly increased; not only Suyang himself, but his younger brother, Grand Prince Anpyeong, also sought an opportunity to take control of the kingdom.

Suyang surrounded himself with trusted allies, including his famous adviser, Han Myeong-hoe, who was the father of two queens: Queen Jangsun, the daughter-in-law of Queen Jeonghui and King Sejo, and Queen Gonghye, the daughter-in-law of Queen Insu and King Deokjong. Han was also an 8th cousin of Queen Insu. Han advised Suyang to take over the government in a coup, and in October 1453, he killed Kim Jongseo and his faction, thereby taking the reins of power into his own hands. After the coup he arrested his own brother, Anpyong, first sending him into exile, then putting him to death.

Family 
 Great-Great-Grandfather
 Kim Tong-hae (김통해, 金通海)
 Great-Grandfather
 Kim Ok (김욱, 金煜)
 Grandfather
 Kim Tae-young (김태영, 金台泳)
 Father 
 Kim Su (김수, 金陲) or Kim Chu (김추, 金錘)
 Mother
 Lady Bae of Seongju Bae clan (성주 배씨, 星州裵氏)
 Grandfather - Bae Gyu (배규, 裵規)
 Siblings
 Older brother - Kim Jong-han (김종한, 金宗漢)
 Younger brother - Kim Jong-heung (김종흥, 金宗興)

 Wives and their children
 Lady Yun of Papyeong Yun clan (파평 윤씨, 坡平 尹氏)
 Son - Kim Seung-gyu (김승규, 金承珪)
 Granddaughter - Lady Kim of the Suncheon Kim clan (순천 김씨)
 Grandson-in-law - Sim Chi (심치, 沈淄)
 Grandson - Kim Jo-dong (김조동, 金祖同)
 Grandson - Kim Su-dong (김수동, 金壽同)
 Son - Kim Seung-byeok (김승벽, 金承璧) (? - 1453)
 Grandson - Kim Jung-nam (김중남, 金中南)
 Great-Grandson - Kim Cha-dong (김차동)
 Great Granddaughter-in-law - Yi Se-hui (이세희, 李世熺), Princess Uiryeong or Princess Uihwa (의령공주/의화공주)
 Son - Kim Seung-yu (김승유, 金承琉)
 Daughter-in-law - Lady Min of the Yeoheung Min clan (여흥 민씨, 驪興 閔氏)
 Grandson - Kim Hyo-dal (김효달, 金孝達)
 Granddaughter-in-law - Lady Jeong of the Hanam Jeong clan (하남 정씨, 河南 程氏)
 Great-Grandson - Kim Seok-gyun (김석균, 金錫龜)
 Great-Grandson - Kim Seok-rin (김석린, 金錫麟)
 Daughter - Lady Kim of the Suncheon Kim clan (순천 김씨)
 Unnamed concubine 
 Son - Kim Mok-dae (김목대, 金目臺)
 Son - Kim Seok-dae (김석대, 金石臺)
 Concubine - Lady Yeo Jin-jok (여진족) — no issue.

Popular culture

 Portrayed by Choi Il-hwa in the 2011 SBS TV series Deep Rooted Tree.
 Portrayed by Han In-soo in the 2011-2012 JTBC TV series Insu, The Queen Mother.
 Portrayed by Lee Soon-jae in the 2011 KBS2 TV series The Princess' Man.
 Portrayed by Baek Yoon-sik in the 2013 film The Face Reader.

Notes

References 

Date of birth missing
1453 deaths
Korean generals
1383 births
15th-century Korean poets